It's Alright or It's All Right may refer to:

Music

Albums 
 It's All Right! (Teddy Edwards album), a 1967 jazz album by Teddy Edwards
 It's All Right! (Wynton Kelly album), a 1964 jazz album
It's Alright (I See Rainbows), a 1982 album by Yoko Ono
It's Alright, a 1977 album by Frank Sinatra Jr.

Songs 
"It's All Right" (The Impressions song), 1963
"But It's Alright" (aka "It's Alright"), by J.J. Jackson, 1966
"It's Alright", by Steve Winwood, 1994
"It's Alright" (311 song), 2009
"It's Alright" (Classic Example song), 1992
"It's Alright" (East 17 song), 1993
"It's Alright" (Echo & the Bunnymen song), 2001
"It's Alright (Baby's Coming Back)", 1985, by Eurythmics
"It's Alright" (Deni Hines song), 1995
"It's Alright" (Jay-Z and Memphis Bleek song), 1998
"It's Alright" (Kaycee Grogan song), 1996
"It's Alright" (Ricky Martin song), 2006
"It's Alright" (Chanté Moore song), 1992
"It's Alright" (Pet Shop Boys song), 1987, originally by Sterling Void, later covered by Pet Shop Boys from the album Introspective
"It's Alright" (Queen Latifah song), 1997
"It's All Right", 1963 song, B-side to Gerry and the Pacemakers' "You'll Never Walk Alone"
"It's All Right", a song by Joe Walsh from his album Songs for a Dying Planet
"It's Alright", by Adam Faith, featured in the film Good Morning Vietnam
"It's Alright", by The American Analog Set, from the album The Fun of Watching Fireworks
"It's Alright", by Big Head Todd and the Monsters, from the album Sister Sweetly
"It's Alright", by Black Sabbath, from the album Technical Ecstasy
"It's Alright", by Candlebox, from the album Happy Pills
"It's Alright", by The Cockroaches from their 1987 debut album: The Cockroaches
"It's Alright", by Fabolous
"It's Alright", by Five from Invincible
"It's Alright", by The Kinks, B-side to the single "You Really Got Me"
"It's Alright", by Matt & Kim
"It's All Right", by Ray Charles, from the album Yes Indeed!
"It's Alright", by Yoko Ono, from the album It's Alright (I See Rainbows)
"It's Alright", theme song to the BBC's New Tricks
"It's Alright (So Far)", by The 1975
"It's Alright" by Paul Stanley, from his 1978 self-titled album
"It's Alright", by Mother Mother, from the album Dance and Cry
"It's Alright", 2021 song from My Little Pony: A New Generation

See also
I'm Alright (disambiguation)